Jean Marie Ferdinand Sarrien ((15 October 1840 – 28 November 1915) was a French politician of the Third Republic. He was born in Bourbon-Lancy, Saône-et-Loire and died in Paris. He headed a cabinet supported by the Bloc des gauches (Left-Wing Coalition) parliamentary majority.

Biography 
Ferdinand Sarrien was born on 15 October 1840 in Bourbon-Lancy. After studying law, he became a lawyer. During the Franco-Prussian War he was distinguished and was decorated.
As a member of the Republican party, he became mayor of his hometown. However, in 1873, he was discharged by the monarchist cabinet of Albert de Broglie.

Sarrien's Ministry, 12 March – 25 October 1906
Ferdinand Sarrien – President of the Council and Minister of Justice
Léon Bourgeois – Minister of Foreign Affairs
Eugène Étienne – Minister of War
Georges Clemenceau – Minister of the Interior
Raymond Poincaré – Minister of Finance
Gaston Doumergue – Minister of Labour, Commerce, and Industry
Gaston Thomson – Minister of Marine
Aristide Briand – Minister of Public Instruction, Fine Arts, and Worship
Joseph Ruau – Minister of Agriculture
Georges Leygues – Minister of Colonies
Louis Barthou – Minister of Public Works, Posts, and Telegraphs

Notes

External links

1840 births
1915 deaths
People from Saône-et-Loire
Politicians of the French Third Republic
Prime Ministers of France
French interior ministers
French Ministers of Posts, Telegraphs, and Telephones
French Ministers of Justice
Senators of Saône-et-Loire